Doresani is an Indian television drama in the Kannada language that premiered on Colors Kannada on 20 December 2021.

Summary 
The story revolves around the lives of the father, daughter, and his boss. Deepika, the apple of her father Purushotham's eye, promises to never fall in love. Unaware of the ways of the heart, she is confident of her decision until she meets Vishwanath Anand, an orphan and self-made man, who runs an auditing firm. Anand is Purushotham's boss at the office whom Purushotham hates because of his strictness in the office. Then Purushotham learns that his daughter is in love with the man he hates.

Cast

Main 
 Prithviraj as Vishwanathan Anand – Purushottham's boss; Deepika's love interest
 Roopika as Deepika – Purushottham's first daughter; Anand's love interest
 Jaidev Mohan as Purushottham – Deepika's father

Recurring 
 Bhavani Prakash as Sathyavathi – Sinchana's mother
 Madhumathi as Soudamini – Deepika's mother; Purushottham's wife
 Shewtha Koglur as Sinchana – Rajath's wife; Sathyavathi's daughter
 Bhuvana Murali as Saptami – Deepika's first younger sister; Purushottham's second daughter
 Prathima as Goutami – Deepika's second younger sister; Purushottam's third daughter
 Darshith Gowda as Rajath – Deepika's elder brother; Purushottam's son
 Amogh Adiga as Sinchana's younger brother; Satyavathi's son
 Sushma as Siri – Anand's office assistant
 Shubha as Ningamma – Anand's house maid who is treated as a family member
 Bhagat snow as Inspector Ram – Anand's best friend
 Gagan Ram as Giridhar – The manager in Anand's office

Cameo appearances 
 Shamanth Gowda as Bro Gowda – Anand's office worker's brother
 Priyanka Thimmesh as Priyanka – Bro Gowda's wife
 Nikhil Kumaraswamy as Himself

Dubbed versions

Production 
The show marks the comeback of actress Roopika after a break from serials. The show is being shot in and around Bengaluru. Some episodes of the show were filmed in the outskirts of Bengaluru.

Soundtrack 
The title song for the series Doresani has been sung by singer Rajath Hegde, Neenada Nayak and Shamir Haripu. The original music is provided by Sunad Gautham.

References 

2021 Indian television series debuts
Colors Kannada original programming
Kannada-language television shows